Jyldyz Mambetaliyeva (Жылдыз Мамбеталиева) (born 26 January 1971) is the justice minister of Kyrgyzstan.

She graduated from the Kazan State University in 1993 with a degree in jurisprudence.

Career
 1993–1994 Consultant of the Constitutional Court of the Kyrgyz Republic
 1994–1995 The prosecutor of Osh oblast prosecutor's office
 1995–1996 Assistant Attorney in the Attorney General's Office of the Kyrgyz Republic
 1996–1999 Assistant of the Legal Department of the Government Office of the Kyrgyz Republic
 1999–2005 Expert Consultant, Expert, Head of Sector of the Legal Department of the Prime Minister of the Kyrgyz Republic
 2005–2008 Deputy head of the department of legal support and human resources services the Government Office
 2008–2015 Deputy Minister of Justice of the Kyrgyz Republic
 From February 2015 Minister of Justice of the Kyrgyz Republic

References 

Living people
1971 births
Kazan Federal University alumni
Female justice ministers
Justice ministers of Kyrgyzstan
Women government ministers of Kyrgyzstan
21st-century Kyrgyzstani women politicians
21st-century Kyrgyzstani politicians